François-Joseph Naderman (5 August 1781, in Paris – 2 April 1835, in Paris) was a classical harpist, teacher and composer, the eldest son of the well-known eighteenth century harp maker Jean Henri Naderman. The profession of his father, luthier, is certainly at the root of his vocation.

There are 27 entries for François Joseph Naderman in the universities of California among caprices, etudes, fantasias, variations and duets for harp and harp, harp and flute, harp and cello, harp and horn combined Music Catalog with estimate dates of publication. His Sonatinas Progressives are still regarded as some of the most important works in harp repertoire today.

Life
A student of Jean-Baptiste Krumpholtz, François Joseph Naderman became a famous musician after the French Revolution, and his reputation continued under the Consulate, the First Empire and the Restoration of the monarchy. In 1815 he was appointed harpist for the Royal Chapel and court composer to the king, and in 1825 he became the first harp professor at the Conservatoire de Paris. His students included artist and composer Therese Emilie Henriette Winkel. He soon began touring around Europe as a virtuoso of the harp. He was a music publisher and a manufacturer of harps in Paris at "The Golden Key", on Rue de la Loi. After his death his widow continued to sell harps, including sheet music of her husband bearing the stamp-signature: Widow Naderman.

Works

Music
Etude Fantastique in B flat major
Etude Fantastique in F major
Variations on the last thought of Weber for solo Harp
3 Nocturnes for Harp and Horn, Op. 32
Nocturne, Tyrolienne and Rondoletto  
3 Sonatas for Harp, Violin and Cello, Op. 5
Sonatinas Progressives for Harp, Op. 92:
Sonatina no 1 in E flat major
Sonatina no 2 in C minor
Sonatina no 3 in B flat major
Sonatina no 4 in G minor
Sonatina no 5 in F major
Sonatina no 6 in D minor
Sonatina no 7 in C major

Scores
Come to Fields (love song), words of Mess. de Coupigni with accompaniment of guitar or lyre by Ferdinando Carulli.Note: (2 pages with the stamp-signature of the widow Naderman and the 3-cent stamp (of right) of the Seine department. Musical partition: piano, guitar or lyre and words in 4 verses of 4 lines each and a refrain.)

References 

Attribution
This article is based on the translation of the corresponding article of the French Wikipedia. A list of contributors can be found there at the History section.

External links

Scores by Naderman via archive.org from the International Harp Archives

1781 births
1835 deaths
19th-century classical composers
19th-century French composers
19th-century French male musicians
Burials at Montmartre Cemetery
Composers for harp
Conservatoire de Paris alumni
French classical harpists
French male classical composers
French music publishers (people)
French Romantic composers
Musicians from Paris